The Pinetown Bushong's Mill Covered Bridge is a covered bridge that spans the Conestoga River in Lancaster County, Pennsylvania, United States. A county-owned and maintained bridge, its official designation is the Big Conestoga #6 Bridge. The bridge is also known as Pinetown Covered Bridge, Nolte's Point Mill Bridge and Bushong's Mill Bridge.

The bridge has a single span, wooden, double Burr arch trusses design with the addition of steel hanger rods.  The deck is made from oak planks. It is painted red, the traditional color of Lancaster County covered bridges, on both the inside and outside.  Both approaches to the bridge are painted in red with white trim.

The bridge's WGCB Number is 38-36-05.  Added in 1980, it is listed on the National Register of Historic Places as structure number 80003527.  It is located at  (40.10533, -76.24817).

Lititz Run joins the Conestoga River at this site.

History
The bridge was built in 1867 by Elias McMellen at a cost of $4,500. In 1972 it was destroyed as a result of flooding caused by Hurricane Agnes. Due to a tremendous response of area residents who signed a petition for its reconstruction, it was among the first covered bridges to be restored after Agnes. In the spring of 1973 the bridge was rebuilt by the nearby Amish. However, the bridge was closed after flood damage sustained due to Tropical Storm Lee in 2011. The bridge was reopened in January 2014.

Dimensions

Length:  span and  total length
Width:  clear deck and  total width
Overhead clearance: 

Gallery

See also
Burr arch truss
List of crossings of the Conestoga River
List of Lancaster County covered bridges

References

Covered bridges in Lancaster County, Pennsylvania
Bridges completed in 1867
Covered bridges on the National Register of Historic Places in Pennsylvania
Bridges over the Conestoga River
1867 establishments in Pennsylvania
National Register of Historic Places in Lancaster County, Pennsylvania
Road bridges on the National Register of Historic Places in Pennsylvania
Wooden bridges in Pennsylvania
Burr Truss bridges in the United States